Steinbach an der Steyr is a municipality in the district of Kirchdorf an der Krems in the Austrian state of Upper Austria.

Geography and geology
Steinbach is in the valley of the river Steyr. The highest hill is the Hochbuchberg. The community area is divided into four subparts: Steinbach, Pieslwang, Forstau and Zehetner. Nearby communities are Grünburg, Ternberg, Aschach an der Steyr, Waldneukirchen and Molln.

The river Steyr on the west side of the community is embedded in deep carved gravel terraces with a few sand banks. The canyon is mostly natural and the water quality is excellent. Its cold temperature of  maximum and strong currents make the shallow river dangerous at several sections.

Emblem
The emblem of Steinbach is a jewelled golden crown in front of blue background. Two crossed rapiers and a standing sword are plotted through the crown. The colors of the community are blue and yellow.

History
In the 11th century the area was part of Styria under Ottokar I of Steyr. A tower or a castle was built on the top of a slope beside the Steyr. At the end of the 12th century the area became part of the dukedom of Austria under the Babenbergers. The castle was not needed anymore and its stones were used for a church for the growing village. A staircase and a farm still reflect the castle in their names. Old stories mention a tunnel between the castle and a second building.

The village contained farms and handicraft enterprises. The farmers were bondsmen. They had to give the tenth part of their harvest to the owners of the farm. The name Zehetner reflects this till today. The handicraft enterprises used water power to work with iron. The metal was brought over the nearby river Enns from Styria. The handicraft enterprises lasted until the 1960s. The community emblem was originally the emblem of the craftsmen. They were named "Messerer". Some old buildings on the riverside still show the emblem. Today a small power plant and a museum also mark their elapsed working place.

Places of interest

 Steyrtalbahn museum train to Steyr (bike waggon included)
 metal work museum
 nativity set museum (230 sets from 70 countries)
 church: late gothic with colored windows (1460), partly baroque (1692)
 old rectory
 View over Upper Austria on the Krahberg

Sports
 Beach volleyball
 Fistball
 Soccer (Union Grünburg Steinbach)
 Motocross
 Biking
 Horse Riding
 Schwimming (open air pool)
 Tennis
 Table tennis
 Hiking (Grünburger Hütte, Kruckenbrettl)

Events
 1.May-festive day
 Perchten lauf (ancient customs)
 Advent market, singing and calendar
 Ortslauf (running event)

Traffic
Public Traffic: The museum train Steyrtalbahn can be used to travel to Steyr partly regularly on Sundays and holy days. A bus route to Bad Hall starts nearby the center. Bus routes to Steyr, Kirchdorf an der Krems, Sierning can be taken in Grünburg at the museum train station.
Car: Steinbach is nearby the state road B140 which goes through Grünburg. A district road leads to Ternberg. The highway A9 can be reached at Sattledt or at Klaus.
Bike: A family friendly part of the bicycle path through the valley of the river Steyr leads to the south to Klaus. An alternative route leads to Molln. In the other direction the bicycle path leads to Steyr. The bicycle through the valley of the river Enns can be reached by using the steep district street to Ternberg.

Economy
Enterprises 
 Transportunternehmen Steiner (transport)
 Rosensteiner GmbH (farming machines)
 Steinbacher Tischlerei (cabinetmaking)
 Steinbacher Versicherung (insurance)

Public buildings
 Library (Center)
 Tourism information (Library)
 Open air pool
 Pils Halle (Festival Center)

Schools
 Playschool
 Primary school
 Music school

References

External links

 Website of Steinbach
 Steinbach at tourism information page
  Steinbach at  Steyrtal.com
 Website Steinbach 2015

Cities and towns in Kirchdorf an der Krems District